Aadavaallu Meeku Joharlu may refer to:

 Aadavaallu Meeku Joharlu (1981 film), Indian Telugu-language film
 Aadavallu Meeku Johaarlu (2022 film), Indian Telugu-language film